More Sorcery is a live album by Hungarian jazz guitarist Gábor Szabó featuring performances recorded in 1967 in Boston and at the Monterey Jazz Festival for the Impulse! label.

Reception
The Allmusic reviewer Scott Yanow stated: "In 1967, guitarist Gabor Szabo had his finest working group... This excellent LP is well worth searching for."

Track listing
All compositions by Gábor Szabó except as indicated
 "Los Matadoros" - 12:09
 "People" (Jule Styne, Bob Merrill) - 5:18
 "Corcovado" (Antônio Carlos Jobim) - 3:22
 "Lucy in the Sky With Diamonds" (John Lennon, Paul McCartney) - 9:42
 "Spellbinder" - 6:49
 "Comin' Back" (Gábor Szabó, Clyde Otis) - 4:55
Recorded at The Jazz Workshop in Boston, Massachusetts on April 14 & 15, 1967 (tracks 1-3) and at the Monterey Jazz Festival in Monterey, California on September 17, 1967 (tracks 4-6)

Personnel
Gábor Szabó - guitar
Jimmy Stewart - guitar
Lajos "Louis" Kabok - bass
Bill Goodwin (tracks 4-6), Marty Morell (tracks 1-3) – drums
Hal Gordon - percussion

References

Impulse! Records live albums
Gábor Szabó albums
1967 live albums
Albums produced by Bob Thiele
Albums recorded at the Monterey Jazz Festival